The Auguste was an 80-gun Bucentaure-class 80-gun ship of the line of the French Navy, designed by Sané.

In 1812, she was part of Gourdon's squadron.

She was renamed Illustre in March 1814, following the Bourbon Restoration. The Treaty of Fontainebleau left her to France, and with 11 other ships of the line, she sailed to her new station in Brest in October.

She was disarmed the next month, and never sailed again. In a state of disrepair, she was broken up in 1827.

References
 Jean-Michel Roche, Dictionnaire des Bâtiments de la flotte de guerre française de Colbert à nos jours, tome I

Ships of the line of the French Navy
Ships built in France
Bucentaure-class ships of the line
1811 ships